Mitsuzō, Mitsuzo or Mitsuzou (written: 光三 or 味津三) is a masculine Japanese given name. Notable people with the name include:

, Japanese sport wrestler
, Japanese writer

Japanese masculine given names